An ulcer is a discontinuity or break in a bodily membrane that impedes normal function of the affected organ.  According to Robbins's pathology, "ulcer is the breach of the continuity of skin, epithelium or mucous membrane caused by sloughing out of inflamed necrotic tissue." Common forms of ulcers recognized in medicine include:
 Ulcer (dermatology), a discontinuity of the skin or a break in the skin.
 Pressure ulcers, also known as bedsores
 Genital ulcer, an ulcer located on the genital area
 Ulcerative dermatitis, a skin disorder associated with bacterial growth often initiated by self-trauma
 Anal fissure, a.k.a. an ulcer or tear near the anus or within the rectum
 Diabetic foot ulcer, a major complication of the diabetic foot
 Callous ulcer, a chronic nonhealing ulcer with hard indurated base and inelastic margins
 Corneal ulcer, an inflammatory or infective condition of the cornea
 Mouth ulcer, an open sore inside the mouth.
 Aphthous ulcer, a specific type of oral ulcer also known as a canker sore
 Peptic ulcer, a discontinuity of the gastrointestinal mucosa (stomach ulcer)
 Venous ulcer, a wound thought to occur due to improper functioning of valves in the veins
 Stress ulcer, an ulcer located  within the stomach and proximal duodenum
 Ulcerative sarcoidosis, a cutaneous condition affecting people with sarcoidosis
 Ulcerative lichen planus, a rare variant of lichen planus
 Ulcerative colitis, a form of inflammatory bowel disease (IBD).
 Ulcerative disposition, a disorder or discomfort that causes severe abdominal distress, often associated with chronic gastritis

References

External links 

Surgery